Costa Rica competed at the 1996 Summer Olympics in Atlanta, United States.  Claudia Poll won the nation's first ever gold medal.

Medalists

Gold
 Claudia Poll — Swimming, Women's 200m Freestyle

Results by event

Athletics
Men's Marathon
 José Luis Molina — 2:17.49 (→ 24th place)

Women's 400 meters
 Zoila Stewart
 Heat — 52.66 (→ did not advance)

Canoeing
Men's Kayak Singles Slalom
 Roger Madrigal

Women's Kayak Singles Slalom
 Gilda Montenegro

Cycling

Mountain Bike
Men's Cross Country
 José Andres Brenes
 Final — 2:25:51 (→ 6th place)

Diving
Women's 3m Springboard
Daphne Hernández
 Preliminary Heat — 151.11 (→ did not advance, 30th place)

Women's 10m Platform
Daphne Hernández
 Preliminary Heat — 217.77 (→ did not advance, 26th place)

Judo
Men's Lightweight
Henry Nuñez

Men's Half-Heavyweight
Ronny Gómez

Swimming
Men's 100m Breaststroke
 Juan José Madrigal
 Preliminary Heat – 1:05.47 (→ did not advance, 34th place)

Women's 200m Freestyle
 Claudia Poll
 Preliminary Heat – 1:59.87
 Final – 1:58.16 (→  Gold Medal)
         
Women's 400m Freestyle
 Claudia Poll
 Preliminary Heat – 4:12.07
 Final – 4:10.00 (→ 5th place)

Women's 200m Butterfly
 Melissa Mata

See also
 Costa Rica at the 1995 Pan American Games

Notes

References
Official Olympic Reports
International Olympic Committee results database

Nations at the 1996 Summer Olympics
1996 Summer Olympics
Olympics